The Black Sequin Dress is a play by Australian playwright Jenny Kemp.

Plot
A woman leaves her children for an evening to go to a nightclub. In a moment of indecision she glances back, slips and falls. Money, desire and dreams converge as she enters a surreal world of haunting colours and lyrical distortions.

Premiere and cast
The Black Sequin Dress was commissioned for the 1996 Adelaide Festival, where the Playbox Theatre Centre premiered it on 5 March 1996 with the following cast:
Woman 1: Margaret Mills
Woman 2: Helen Herbertson
Woman 3: Natasha Herbert
Woman 4: Mary Sitarenos
Man: Ian Scott
Waiter: Greg Stone
Girl’s voice: Romanie Harper
Director, Jenny Kemp
Composer, Elizabeth Drake
Designer, Jacqueline Everitt
Lighting designer, Ben Cobham

Publication
The play was published by Currency Press in 1996.

References

External links
 The Black Sequin Dress at the AusStage database

Australian plays
1996 plays